Grupo Desportivo Nova Alianca , usually known simply as Nova Alianca, is a traditional football (soccer) club based in Maputo, Mozambique.

Stadium
The club plays their home matches at Alyans since 2008 at Ferroviario das Mahotas], which has a maximum capacity of 10,000 people.

References

Football clubs in Mozambique
Sport in Maputo